Cristian David Brítez Sánchez (born 25 September 1984) is a Paraguayan football goalkeeper who plays for Club Martín Ledesma.

Club career
Brítez began his career in the lower divisions of Club Sol de América. In 2008, Britez joined Universidad de Concepción of the Primera División de Chile, and was immediately loaned to Deportes Antofagasta, from first-tier too. The incoming year, he was loaned again, now to Deportes Puerto Montt from the second level.

He finally began to play for Universidad de Concepción in mid-2009, becoming as back-up of Federico Elduayen. For the 2010 season, following Elduayen's departure, Brítez became the team's first-choice keeper.

After being released from Concepción-based team in December 2012, he returned his homeland, joining to Tacuary in 2013.

International career
At some point, he had the opportunity to go to the Paraguay national football team, according to the reports, an informant of the Paraguay coach, Gerardo Martino, was following this player.

Club statistics

References

External links
 
 BDFA Profile 

1984 births
Living people
Paraguayan footballers
Paraguayan expatriate footballers
Club Sol de América footballers
Universidad de Concepción footballers
C.D. Antofagasta footballers
Puerto Montt footballers
Chilean Primera División players
Primera B de Chile players
Expatriate footballers in Chile
Paraguayan expatriate sportspeople in Chile
Association football goalkeepers